"Rescue Me" is a song by American singer Madonna from her first greatest hits album, The Immaculate Collection (1990). Written and produced by Madonna and Shep Pettibone, the song was not planned to be released as a single initially, but its continuous radio airplay prompted Sire Records to release "Rescue Me" as the second single from The Immaculate Collection on February 26, 1991, in the United States, and as the third single on April 7 in the United Kingdom. A dance-pop and gospel-house track, the song is accompanied by the sound of thunder and rain, with the lyrics talking of romantic love rescuing the singer.

The song's commercial release was accompanied by different remixes. "Rescue Me" received positive critical response for both the original version and the remixes, as well as Pettibone's production work. Reviewers noted it as an example of Madonna's future musical endeavors to come. "Rescue Me" reached the top-ten of the record charts in Canada, Denmark, Ireland, Netherlands, Norway, the United Kingdom and the United States. In the latter country it became Madonna's 22nd top-ten song on the Billboard Hot 100. Lyrics from the song were used during an interlude on Madonna's 2019–20 Madame X Tour.

Background and release
By the end of 1990, Madonna was ready to release her first greatest hits collection, The Immaculate Collection. According to J. Randy Taraborrelli, author of Madonna: An Intimate Biography, the release was "much more than a mere collection of Madonna's biggest-selling and most popular songs". The singer relegated it as a "proud landmark" of her career which had progressed upwards since she broke out in the music scene in 1982. The collection had 15 of Madonna's previously released singles, along with two new songs, "Justify My Love" and "Rescue Me". The former was released as the first single from the record, and was controversial due to its explicit music video which had been banned from airing in television.

Initially there were no plans to release any follow-up single to "Justify My Love" and so no music video was filmed for "Rescue Me". However, the latter started receiving airplay in the radios as an album cut, prompting Sire Records to finally release it as an official single. The cover artwork featured a still image of Madonna from the music video of "Justify My Love". In the United States, the track was released as the second single on February 26, 1991, and as the third single on April 7 in the United Kingdom, due to "Crazy for You" (1985) released as the second single from the collection. 

A video clip consisting of compiled footage from Madonna's 1987 Who's That Girl World Tour was eventually released to accompany the single. Lyrics from the song were used during an interlude on Madonna's 2019–20 Madame X Tour; a row of dancers "convulsed gracefully" to the song at the lip of the stage to irregular breaths, described as one of the concert's "most powerful dance moments" by The New York Times Jon Pareles.

Recording and composition
Madonna wrote and produced "Rescue Me" with Shep Pettibone, with whom she had worked on "Vogue". It was recorded at Axis Studios in New York City by engineer P. Dennis Mitchell, who was assisted by Curt Frasca and John Partham. Peter Schwartz played keyboards and did the programming on the track with assistance from Joe Moskowitz and Junior Vasquez. Tony Shimkin edited the song at Axis while Ted Jensen mastered it at Sterling Sound Studio. "Rescue Me" was mixed by Pettibone and Goh Hotoda at Sound Works Studio in New York. The mixing was done in QSound which at that time was a new audio filter to create a three-dimensional sound effect. This was employed on all of Madonna's past hits present on The Immaculate Collection.

"Rescue Me" is a dance-pop and gospel-house track. Larry Flick from Billboard described the song as a house colored pop-dance rave. According to sheet music published at Musicnotes.com by Alfred Publishing, the song is composed in the key of D major with a moderate tempo of 116 beats per minute. It is set in the time signature of common time with Madonna's vocals ranging from B3 to E5. The song follows a sequence of Em–D/E–Asus4/E–A/E as its chord progression. The song opens with a heartbeat and thunder, followed by a prominent bass line, piano, snaps, and percussion. Reminiscent of the songs by British synth-pop duo Yazoo and other 1980s disco acts, "Rescue Me" has Madonna growling the lines, especially towards the end. The thick arrangement has backing vocals by Dian Sorel, Catherine Russell and Broadway actor Lillias White. The ending of the track has the instrumentation fading away to leave just the backing vocals and then the song ends with the sound of thunder and rain.

Lyrically, "Rescue Me" makes allusions to love rescuing the singer. Author Santiago Fouz-Hernández noted in the book Madonna's Drowned Worlds that the lines portray the second theme prevalent in Madonna's work alongside sex, that of romantic love. The singer relegates love as savior in the lyrics when she belts "I believe in the power of love / I believe that you can rescue me". It references the 1967 songs, "Stop Her on Sight (S.O.S.)" by Edwin Starr and "Respect" by Aretha Franklin. According to Katharine Birbalsingh from The Daily Telegraph, the confessional lyrics found Madonna reaching out directly to the listener, "pleading for the love and attention" needed through the lines like "You see that I'm ferocious, you see that I am weak / You see that I am silly, and pretentious and a freak" before it turned to an affirmation of her grit.

Outside of the US, the song was released with Madonna's 1987 single "Spotlight" as its B-side. It was accompanied by eight different remixes by Pettibone. An extended mix was created called the "Titanic Vocal mix", alongside a stripped down "Houseboat Vocal mix" which used a new beat and instrumentation, the sound of piano and a sample from Madonna's 1986 single, "True Blue". The Lifeboat and the S.O.S. mixes incorporate louder and busy beats with the former being similar in composition to "Vogue". All of them keep the original vocals intact in the remix, with a dubbed version also being released.

Critical reception
Larry Flick from Billboard described Madonna's vocals as her "most potent to date" and Pettibone's production "stellar", while also complimenting that the song's remixes, saying Pettibone "has outdone himself this time, creating several new versions that should suit a variety of formats... In any mix, 'Rescue Me' proves to be far meatier and long-lasting than the previous 'Justify My Love'." Taraborrelli described the track as a "standard, pulsating dance fare" noting it to be opposite of "Justify My Love". Rikky Rooksby found the "growling" vocals by Madonna to be "ill-advised" but was positive about the ending of the track with the sound of the rain and thunder. David Browne from Entertainment Weekly called the song as a "flimsy 'Vogue' rewrite" in his review for The Immaculate Collection, feeling that it did not break "new ground" for the singer. Alan Jones from Music Week stated that Madonna "moves uptempo with a rhythmically apposite dancefloor contender which will shine at retail too." He added, "Her consistency is awesome." James Hamilton from Record Mirror described it as "a gospel chorus punctuated at turns rasping and mumbling plaintive unhurried trotter". In an album guide for Rolling Stone, the track was described as "worthy" and "sensual". Andrew Harrison from Select relegated it as "more usual upfront Madonna dance workout with histrionic strings" but found it—along with "Justify My Love"—to showcase the singer's vulnerability, sexual predication and submission, all of which gave "Madonna's records an edge". 

Jose F. Promis from AllMusic reviewed the remixes by Pettibone and gave a positive review believing them to have held up "surprisingly well" many years since their release and are "good examples of what house/pop dance music was like in the early '90s". A reviewer from Sputnikmusic rated the song four out of five, finding it similar to "Justify My Love" but "just not as good. It's a shame that this ends the album rather than [the former], but that's the way it goes, I suppose". Robbie Daw from Idolator listed "Rescue Me" as one of the best Madonna songs that radio had forgotten noting that the track, along with "Justify My Love" "kicked off [her] early '90s period where she gabbed through tracks rather than singing on them". Eric Henderson from Slant Magazine, while reviewing Celebration, described "Rescue Me" as "simmering" and the "upside" of The Immaculate Collection. James Rose from Daily Review noted that with the song Madonna began "a phase of her career that oscillates between cynical self-exploitation and courageous self-expression. Raunchy videos, explicitly themed lyrics and boudoir beats became de rigueur for the lady now arguably bearing the biggest name in popular music." LA Weeklys Michael Cooper ranked the track at number 14 in his list of Madonna's Top 20 Singles. He opined that the song heralded the singer's future musical endeavors with fifth studio album Erotica (1992), and was "innovative for its time" bridging the gap between Madonna of the 1980s and 1990s. Chuck Arnold from Entertainment Weekly listed "Rescue Me" as Madonna's 45th best single, writing that "if 'Vogue' had a gospel choir taking it to church, it might sound something like ['Rescue Me']". While ranking Madonna's singles in honor of her 60th birthday, Jude Rogers from The Guardian placed the track at number 44, calling it an example of the "over propulsive early-90s electronica". In March 2023, Billboard ranked the song as Madonna's 99th greatest ever, with Joe Lynch writing: "Tension-laden synths, a bubbling bass line and a warm house beat swirl like a baptismal rainstorm".

Chart performance

In the United States, Michael Ellis from Billboard noted that "Rescue Me" had entered the Hot 100 Airplay chart  prior to its commercial release, and had already climbed to number seven. It was already being played in almost all major radio stations in the country. After release, the track debuted at number 15 on the Billboard Hot 100 chart on the week of March 2, 1991. It was the highest debut for a song within the previous 21 years, since the Beatles' "Let It Be" debuted at number six in March 1970. After three weeks the song reached number nine on the Hot 100, becoming Madonna's 22nd top-ten single. The track reached number six on the Dance Club Songs chart, aided by the remixes played in clubs. On May 24, 1991, "Rescue Me" was certified gold by the Recording Industry Association of America (RIAA) for shipments of over 500,000 copies. In Canada, the song debuted on the RPM Top Singles chart at number 96 and reached a peak of number seven after nine weeks. It also reached top-five on the RPM Dance/Urban chart. The song was present for a total of 16 weeks on the Singles chart and ranked at number 55 on the 1991 year-end tabulation.

In Australia, "Rescue Me" debuted at number 31 on the ARIA Charts, and after four weeks reached a peak of number 15. In New Zealand the song managed to reach number 18 and was present for six weeks on the chart. In the United Kingdom, the track had debuted at number 84 on the UK Singles Chart and then dropped off. It re-entered at number four in April 1991 and reached its peak position of number three a week later, being present for a total of nine weeks in the chart. According to Music & Media, the track reached the top of the UK sales chart. As of August 2008, it has sold 134,767 copies in the country according to the Official Charts Company. Across Europe, "Rescue Me" reached the top 20 of the charts in Belgium, Denmark, Ireland, Netherlands, Norway and Switzerland, and top 40 in France, Germany and Sweden. Its commercial performance in the European countries helped it attain a peak of number three on the European Hot 100 Singles chart, placing at number 90 on the year-end ranking.

Track listing and formats

US 12-inch maxi and cassette
 "Rescue Me" (Titanic vocal mix) – 8:15
 "Rescue Me" (Houseboat vocal mix) – 6:56
 "Rescue Me" (Lifeboat vocal mix) – 5:20
 "Rescue Me" (S.O.S. Mix) – 6:21

US 7-inch and Japanese 3-inch CD single
 "Rescue Me" (single mix) – 4:51
 "Rescue Me" (alternate single mix) – 5:06

UK 7-inch single
 "Rescue Me" (single mix) – 4:51
 "Spotlight" – 6:26

Australian 7-inch vinyl
 "Rescue Me" (single mix) – 4:51
 "Rescue Me" (album version) – 5:31

US Digipak CD maxi-single
 "Rescue Me" (single mix)- 4:51
 "Rescue Me" (Titanic vocal) – 8:16
 "Rescue Me" (Houseboat vocal) – 6:58
 "Rescue Me" (Lifeboat vocal) – 5:19
 "Rescue Me" (S.O.S. Mix) – 6:25

European CD single
 "Rescue Me" (S.O.S. Mix) – 6:21
 "Rescue Me" (Lifeboat vocal mix) – 5:20
 "Rescue Me" (Houseboat vocal mix) – 6:56

German CD single
 "Rescue Me" (single mix) – 4:53
 "Rescue Me" (Titanic vocal) – 8:15
 "Rescue Me" (Demanding dub) – 5:20

Digital single
 "Rescue Me" – 4:56
 "Rescue Me" (Titanic vocal) – 8:16
 "Rescue Me" (Houseboat vocal) – 6:58
 "Rescue Me" (Lifeboat vocal) – 5:19
 "Rescue Me" (S.O.S. Mix) – 6:25
 "Rescue Me" (Demanding dub) – 5:21
 "Rescue Me" (alternate single mix) – 5:07

Credits and personnel
Credits are adapted from The Immaculate Collection liner notes.

Management
 Recorded at Axis Studios, New York City, New York
 Mastered at Sterling Sound Studios, New York City, New York
 Mixed at Sound Works Studio, New York City, New York
 Freddy DeMann Management, The DeMann Entertainment Co. Ltd.
 Webo Girl Publishing, Inc., Warner Bros. Music Corp, Bleu Disc Music Co. Inc, Lexor Music (ASCAP)

Personnel

 Madonna – vocals, writer, producer
 Shep Pettibone – writer, producer, audio mixing
 P. Dennis Mitchell – recording engineer, recording
 Ted Jensen – mastering
 Goh Hotoda – audio mixing
 Curt Frasca – assistant engineer
 John Partham – assistant engineer
 Peter Schwartz – keyboard, programming
 Joe Moskowitz – additional programming
 Junior Vasquez – extra programming
 Tony Shimkin – editing
 Dian Sorel – background vocals
 Catherine Russell – background vocals
 Lillias White – background vocals
 Herb Ritts – photographer
 Jeri Heiden – art director

Charts

Weekly charts

Year-end charts

Certification and sales

See also
 List of Billboard Hot 100 top 10 singles in 1991
 List of RPM number-one dance singles of 1991
 List of UK Singles Chart top 10 singles in 1991

References

Book sources

External links
 "Rescue Me" on Spotify

1990 songs
1991 singles
Gospel songs
House music songs
Madonna songs
Sire Records singles
Song recordings produced by Madonna
Song recordings produced by Shep Pettibone
Songs written by Madonna
Songs written by Shep Pettibone
Warner Records singles